The Suncorp Super Netball Team of the Year is an All-Star team consisting of the best players from the Suncorp Super Netball competition in Australia.

The inaugural team was selected in 2017, at the conclusion of the season.

Teams

2017-22

References

Team